Jonne Halttunen (born 13 December 1985) is a Finnish rally co-driver. Currently, he is the co-driver of Kalle Rovanperä, driving the Toyota GR Yaris Rally1. Previously, they represented Škoda Motorsport to participate in the World Rally Championship-2 Pro category.

Rally career

Halttunen made his debut at 2011 Rally Finland. In 2017, he started to cooperate with the young Finn Kalle Rovanperä in the WRC-2 class. They won the class victory as well as scored their first career points just in their second rally in Australia. They won their second and third category victory at 2018 Wales Rally GB and 2018 Rally Catalunya respectively.

In 2019, they were promoted to the newly-created World Rally Championship-2 Pro category. Having won in Chile and Portugal, the crew led the championship by three points.

Rally victories

WRC victories

WRC-2 victories

WRC-2 Pro victories

Career results

WRC results
 
* Season still in progress.

WRC-2 results

WRC-2 Pro results

References

External links

 Jonne Halttunen's e-wrc profile

1985 births
Living people
Finnish rally co-drivers
World Rally Championship co-drivers